John Franklin Ryan (November 9, 1848 – November 30, 1936) was a Virginia politician.  He represented Loudoun County in the Virginia House of Delegates, and served as that body's Speaker from 1894 until 1899, and again from 1901 until 1906.

Ryan was identified as possibly having been involved in Virginia's Jim Crow-era segregation laws during the naming process for an elementary school in Loudoun County; the school in question was ultimately named Waxpool Elementary School instead.

References

List of former Speakers of the House of Delegates, in the old House chamber in the Virginia State Capitol

External links
 
 

Members of the Virginia House of Delegates
Speakers of the Virginia House of Delegates
People from Loudoun County, Virginia
1848 births
1936 deaths